Siliguri College (also known as City College), established on October 8, 1950, is the oldest college in Siliguri, in the Indian state of West Bengal.The college was earlier affiliated to the University of Calcutta till 1962 but later got changed to the University of North Bengal.It is now affiliated and accredited to University of North Bengal.The college offers Undergraduate courses in Arts and Sciences and also offers Postgraduate courses in Bengali and Geography .It offers admissions to students based on their merit in academics.Siliguri College also offers schemes like NSS and NCC for the benefit of students.The campus is located in Darjeeling district of West Bengal.

History

Siliguri college was established on 8 October 1950 by Government of West Bengal under a dispersal scheme of the Refugee Relief and Rehabilitation Department with a view to imparting higher education to the refugee student population of the post-partition of Siliguri. Initially, after inception it was affiliated to Calcutta University. Later, in 1962, it transferred to the University of North Bengal.

Gallery

List of Principals of Siliguri College

Programmes Offered

Affiliation and Accreditation

The college is recognized by the University Grants Commission (UGC). It was accredited by the National Assessment and Accreditation Council (NAAC), and awarded B+ grade. The college was affiliated to University of Calcutta till 1962. Currently it is affiliated to University of North Bengal.

Library 

The college has a library with a collection of text and reference books. Currently, it contains around 45151 regular and out of print volumes. 5 newspapers are available in the library and 10 printed journals are subscribed.

Hostel 
The college also contains two separate hostels for boys and girls. Boys hostel has a capacity of 63 students whereas newly build girls hostel can accommodate up to 48 students.

Notable alumni
Charu Majumdar, politician, founder of Naxalbari uprising

See also

References

External links
Siliguri College
University of North Bengal
University Grants Commission
National Assessment and Accreditation Council

Colleges affiliated to University of North Bengal
Educational institutions established in 1950
Universities and colleges in Darjeeling district
Education in Siliguri
1950 establishments in West Bengal